Dehdar is a village in Bala Taleqan Rural District, in the Central District of Taleqan County, Alborz Province, Iran. At the 2006 census, its population was 123, in 27 families.

this village it have historical places for example: the Castel of kian banoo(Kian khatoon Castel or Nodè Castel ) 1100 bc . 

and historical bath that was  constructed in 1590.

References 

Populated places in Taleqan County